Golconda No. 3 Precinct is located in Pope County, Illinois, USA. Its borders are coextensive with the city of Golconda. As of the 2000 census, its population was 726.

Geography

References

Precincts in Pope County, Illinois